Solinari is the second album by the American doom metal band Morgion. It was released in 1999 by Relapse Records.

Track listing
  "The Serpentine Scrolls / Descent to Arawn"   – 10:33  
  "Canticle"  – 6:42  
  "Solinari"  – 2:26  
  "Nightfall Infernal"  – 11:06  
  "All the Glory..."  – 6:04  
  "...All the Loss"  – 6:21  
  "Blight"  – 4:46  
  "...The Last Sunrise"  – 4:48

References

1999 albums
Morgion (band) albums